Yaishwe Best (born 6 July 1939) is a Burmese boxer. He competed in the men's flyweight event at the 1956 Summer Olympics.

References

External links
 

1939 births
Living people
Burmese male boxers
Olympic boxers of Myanmar
Boxers at the 1956 Summer Olympics
Place of birth missing (living people)
Flyweight boxers